The canton of Vallée Dordogne is an administrative division of the Dordogne department, southwestern France. It was created at the French canton reorganisation which came into effect in March 2015. Its seat is in Saint-Cyprien.

It consists of the following communes:

Allas-les-Mines
Audrix
Berbiguières
Besse
Bouzic
Campagnac-lès-Quercy
Carves
Castelnaud-la-Chapelle
Castels et Bézenac
Cénac-et-Saint-Julien
Cladech
Coux-et-Bigaroque-Mouzens
Daglan
Doissat
Domme
Florimont-Gaumier
Grives
Groléjac
Larzac
Lavaur
Loubejac
Marnac
Mazeyrolles
Meyrals
Monplaisant
Nabirat
Orliac
Pays-de-Belvès
Prats-du-Périgord
Sagelat
Saint-Aubin-de-Nabirat
Saint-Cernin-de-l'Herm
Saint-Cybranet
Saint-Cyprien
Sainte-Foy-de-Belvès
Saint-Germain-de-Belvès
Saint-Laurent-la-Vallée
Saint-Martial-de-Nabirat
Saint-Pardoux-et-Vielvic
Saint-Pompont
Salles-de-Belvès
Siorac-en-Périgord
Veyrines-de-Domme
Villefranche-du-Périgord

References

Cantons of Dordogne